Kai-awase (貝合わせ) is a Japanese game with shells.

The shells in the inside would have elaborate paintings, often depicting scenes from the Tale of Genji. The aim of the game was to find the other half that would fit.

The game of e-awase would develop from it later.

References

External links 

Japanese games